Glasgow United Football Club are a Scottish football club based in Shettleston, in the East End of Glasgow. Nicknamed the Town, they were formed in 1903 as Shettleston Juniors Football & Athletic Club and renamed prior to the 2021–22 season.

Shettleston reached the final of the 1958–59 Scottish Junior Cup, losing 2–1 to Irvine Meadow in front of a crowd of 65,211 fans at Hampden Park. Their fortunes have been mixed in recent years, flitting between the various divisions of the league they have been based in, although they managed to reach the semi-finals of the Scottish Junior Cup in 2000–01, and the quarter-finals of the same competition in 2001–02 and 2014–15.

The team have been led jointly since January 2017 by Club owner Hugh Kelly & Bernard ‘Bernie’ Beacom. Kelly & Beacom replaced the previous management team of Peter Weatherson and Ryan McStay. On 26 January 2022, the club confirmed Rab Stevenson as their new manager.

Ground 
 
Glasgow United play their games in Greenfield Park, situated in Old Shettleston Road, eastern Glasgow. The ground has a capacity of 1,800 and can seat 10 people. The pitch is made of natural grass. The ground's capacity is made up of 2 main stands. The largest being the stand situated on the west of the pitch, which is sheltered and has the few seats available in the ground. The goal opposite is an empty grassed standing area. The second stand, located on the south of the pitch, has limited shelter but larger space for standing. The north of the pitch is empty space which holds no lasting spectating facilities, though this space has the opportunity to be closed off for an expanded capacity. The ground is also connected to a social club on the west of the park.

Players

Current squad 
As of 6 November 2021:

Other squads 
Glasgow United also have a Under-20s team and a 2004's team.

Honours
(as Shettleston)

Scottish Junior Cup
 Runners-up: 1958–59

 West Region Super First Division: runners-up (promoted): 2014–15
 West Region League One: champions: 2019-20
 West of Scotland Cup winners: 1974–75, 1992–93, 1994–95
 Glasgow Junior League winners: 1923–24, 1926–27
 Central League A Division winners: 1976–77
 Central Division One winners: 1985–86, 1998–99, 2001–02
 Glasgow Junior Cup: 1957–58, 1958–59, 1959–60, 1967–68
 Central League Cup: 1954–55, 1972–73, 2001–02
 Central Sectional League Cup: 1969–70, 1976–77, 1979–80
 Glasgow Junior Consolation Cup: 1925–26, 1937–38
 Glasgow North-Eastern Cup: 1936–37, 1959–60, 1960–61
 Erskine Hospital Charity Cup: 1983–84, 1984–85, 1985–86
 Glasgow Junior Charity Cup: 1929–30, 1937–38, 1956–57
 Glasgow Eastern Charity Cup: 1926–27, 1949–50, 1951–52, 1959–60

Notable former players
 Bob Connelly
 Tommy Docherty
 A. Scott Duncan
 Campbell Forsyth 
 Bill Gorman
 Ernie Merrick
 Keigan Parker 
 Bobby Russell 
 John Wheatley
 Brian McEwan

Notable assistant coach
 Tommy Coyne

References

External links
Website
Twitter

 

 

Association football clubs established in 1903
Football clubs in Scotland
Scottish Junior Football Association clubs
Football clubs in Glasgow
1903 establishments in Scotland
West of Scotland Football League teams